The lateral clicks are a family of click consonants found only in African languages. The clicking sound used by equestrians to urge on their horses is a lateral click, although it is not a speech sound in that context. Lateral clicks are found throughout southern Africa, for example in Zulu, and in some languages in Tanzania and Namibia. The place of articulation is not known to be contrastive in any language, and typically varies from alveolar to palatal.

Prior to 1989,  was the IPA letter for the lateral clicks, and this is still preferred by some phoneticians, as the vertical bar may be confounded with prosody marks and, in some fonts, with a double lowercase L. Either letter may be combined with a second letter to indicate the manner of articulation, though this is commonly omitted for tenuis clicks. 

In official IPA transcription, the click letter is combined with a  via a tie bar, though  is frequently omitted. Either letter, whether baseline or superscript, is usually placed before the click letter, but may come after when the release of the velar or uvular occlusion is audible. A third convention is the click letter with diacritics for voicelessness, voicing and nasalization; it does not distinguish velar from uvular lateral clicks. Common lateral clicks are:

The last is what is heard in the sound sample above, as non-native speakers tend to glottalize clicks to avoid nasalizing them.

In the orthographies of individual languages, the letters and digraphs for lateral clicks may be based on either the vertical bar symbol of the IPA, or on the Latin  of Bantu convention. Nama and most Saan languages use the former; Naro, Sandawe, and Zulu use the latter.

Features 
The specific articulation of lateral clicks may vary from language to language, from dental to palatal, apical or laminal, though no contrast between such articulations has been confirmed apart from the retroflex clicks, which may have lateral release.

Features of lateral clicks:

 The release of the forward place of articulation is a noisy, affricate-like sound in southern Africa, but abrupt in Hadza and Sandawe in East Africa.

 They are lateral consonants, which means they are produced by releasing the airstream at the side of the tongue, rather than in the middle. Some speakers pronounce them on one side of the mouth, some on both.

Regarding Khoekhoe, Tindall notes that European learners almost invariably pronounce these sounds as simple laterals, by placing the tongue against the side teeth, and that this articulation is "harsh and foreign to the native ear". The Namaqua instead cover the whole of the palate with the tongue, and produce the sound "as far back in the palate as possible".

Occurrence 

English does not have a lateral click (or any click consonant, for that matter) as a phoneme, but an unreleased lateral click does occur as an interjection, usually written tchick! or tchek! (and often reduplicated tchick-tchick!), used to urge a horse to move. A form of click can also be heard by some English speakers when scoffing, but this is generally a dental click rather than a lateral click.

See also 
 Fricated palatal click (described as having a lateral release)
 Retroflex click (has a fricated lateral release)

References

External links
 

Alveolar consonants
Click consonants
Lateral consonants